Amalia Streitel (24 November 1844 – 6 March 1911) was a German Roman Catholic nun. Streitel established the Sisters of the Sorrowful Mother and assumed the new name of "Maria Franziska of the Cross" after she had become a nun.

In 2010 she was proclaimed to be Venerable after the recognition of her life of heroic virtue. The miracle that is required for her beatification is now under investigation.

Life
Streitel was born in Mellrichstadt, on 24 November 1844, the eldest of four children to Adam and Franziska Horhammer Streitel. At an early age, she became skillful in needlework. After her elementary education, Amalia was sent to the Maria Stern Franciscan Institute to Augsburg. There she earned a diploma in French and music.

Streitel was trained to be a teacher, but at the age of seventeen, felt drawn to religious life. Her parents opposed her vocation but relented when she reached the age of 21. In September 1866, she returned to the Franciscan Institute in Augsburg. She made her profession as a novice and assumed the habit and the name "Sister Mary Angela" in June 1867. In 1868, she began teaching, French, music, and needlework to students at a convent in Munich. From 1872 until 1880 she directed an orphanage.

Drawn to a life of contemplation and solitude, in 1882, she transferred to a Carmelite convent in Würzburg, where she received the name "Sister Petra".  Despite this she came to understand that her true vocation was not in the cloister but a more active apostolate.

She relocated to Rome in 1883 in order to assist Francis Mary of the Cross Jordan and the order that he had established. Together they established a new community, the Sisters of the Catholic Teaching Society. After making her vows in this new community before Father Jordan, Sister Petra received her final name, "Maria Franziska of the Cross". The rules she drew up were marked by great severity concerning evangelical poverty and austerity of life. Jordan felt the strict regulations concerning fasting were a bit rigorous for a congregation destined for strenuous works of charity in hospitals, schools and missions. She and Father Jordan had different personalities and charisms and it led to a split between the two.

On 4 October 1885 she established her new community. Pope Leo XIII gave it the name of the Sisters of the Sorrowful Mother. It received the papal approval of Pope Pius X on the date of her death. It melded the charisms of the Carmelite and Franciscan orders.

Streitel died on 6 March 1911. Her order continues its work in Europe and has expanded to Africa and South America.

Beatification process
The beatification process commenced with two local processes in Civita Castellana and also in Würzburg. This occurred despite the fact that the cause did not open on a formal level until 13 June 1947 under Pope Pius XII. The two processes - in order for the cause to proceed - received formal decrees of ratification in 1952. The Positio - documentation and an account of her life - was submitted to the Congregation for the Causes of Saints in 2004.

The declaration of her life of heroic virtue was announced on 27 March 2010 which allowed for Pope Benedict XVI to confer upon her the title of Venerable.

The miracle needed for her beatification was investigated and was ratified in 2004. The Medical Board that advises the Congregation for the Causes of Saints approved the miracle in mid 2010.

References

External links
Hagiography Circle
Saints SQPN
Sisters of the Sorrowful Mother

1844 births
1911 deaths
19th-century venerated Christians
20th-century venerated Christians
Founders of Catholic religious communities
Franciscans
19th-century German Roman Catholic nuns
Venerated Catholics by Pope Benedict XVI
20th-century German Roman Catholic nuns